Music From the Motion Picture Down to Earth is the soundtrack to Paul and Chris Weitz's 2001 film Down to Earth. It was released on February 13, 2001 through Epic/Sony Music Soundtrax. It consisted of a blend of hip hop and contemporary R&B music. The soundtrack was a minor success, peaking at #71 on the Billboard 200 and #34 on the Top R&B/Hip-Hop Albums, and spawned two promotional singles: Ruff Endz's "Someone to Love You" which peaked at #49 on the Billboard Hot 100 and Monica's "Just Another Girl" which peaked at #64 on the same chart.

Track listing

Charts

References

External links

2001 soundtrack albums
Comedy film soundtracks
Hip hop soundtracks
Albums produced by Dr. Dre
Albums produced by Cory Rooney
Albums produced by Scott Storch
Albums produced by Tricky Stewart
Albums produced by Bryan-Michael Cox